Calenzano is a comune (municipality) in the Metropolitan City of Florence in the Italian region Tuscany, located about  northwest of Florence.

Calenzano borders the following municipalities: Barberino di Mugello, Campi Bisenzio, Prato, San Piero a Sieve, Sesto Fiorentino, Vaglia, Vaiano.

Main sights 
Villa Ginori a Collina, a patrician villa
Church of San Niccolò e Oratorio della Compagnia del Santissimo Sacramento, rebuilt before 1386. It includes frescoes by Jacopo and Nardo di Cione and a panel by Domenico Cresti.
Pieve  di San Donato (9th-11th centuries), with a Renaissance cloister built in 1460 by Carlo de' Medici.
Pieve di Santa Maria (built before the 11th century). It houses a Madonna with St. Thomas from Lorenzo di Credi's workshop and a St. Anthony the Abbot from Ridolfo del Ghirlandaio's school.
The ancient Pieve di San Severo, with frescoes from the 14th-15th centuries.
Church of Santa Lucia a Settimello (before 10th century, rebuilt in Baroque style in the early 18th century). It houses a terracotta by Benedetto Buglioni (1507) and a wooden crucifix by Baccio da Montelupo (early 16th century)
Parco del Neto (park), at the foot of Monte Morello.

Transportation 
Calenzano has a station on the regional railway connecting it to Prato, Florence, Pistoia and Lucca. It can be reached by road from the A1 Motorway. Bus services connect it to Prato, Florence, Campi Bisenzio and Barberino di Mugello.

Demographic evolution

References

External links
 

Cities and towns in Tuscany